Thiruvanmiyur is a station on the Chennai MRTS in India. Located opposite the Tidel Park on Rajiv Gandhi Salai at Taramani, it exclusively serves the Chennai MRTS.

History
Thiruvanmiyur station was opened on 26 January 2004, as part of the second phase of the Chennai MRTS network. Since it was the terminal station at the time of its opening, a crossover was initially planned at the station to divert the trains between up and down directions. However, this was never realised as the project administration failed to include this requirement in the revised proposal for ballastless track. The up and down lines between Tirumailai and Tiruvanmiyur (a station before Velacheri) were completed during 2003. Execution of the balance portion of work beyond Tiruvanmiyur had been delayed due to the sinkage of earth. Owing to this, trains moving in the 'up' direction from Thirumailai to Thiruvanmiyur were required to be moved to the 'down' line for the return trip. In addition, safety was also in question with the operation of trains in both lines without the crossover. This led to operating trains only in the 'up' line for a long time until the construction of stations till Velachery. The 'down' line created at a cost of  1,850 million had been idling for several months.

Structure
The elevated station is on the western banks of the Buckingham Canal.

Service and connections
Thiruvanmiyur station is the fourteenth station on the MRTS line to Velachery. In the return direction from Velachery, it is currently the fourth station towards Chennai Beach station, which will become the seventh station upon completion of the entire stretch up to St. Thomas Mount.

Developments
In September 2013, the Indian Railway Catering and Tourism Corporation (IRCTC) invited tenders for setting up a food plaza in the station, along with two other stations, namely, Thirumayilai and Velachery.

See also
 Chennai MRTS
 Chennai suburban railway
 Chennai Metro
 Transport in Chennai

References

Chennai Mass Rapid Transit System stations
Railway stations in Chennai
Railway stations opened in 2004